Benjamin Anastas (born 1969) is an American novelist, memoirist, journalist and book reviewer born in Gloucester, Massachusetts. He teaches literature and writing at Bennington College and is on the faculty of the Bennington Writing Seminars MFA program.

Writing career

Fiction
Anastas started publishing his short fiction while still a graduate student at the Iowa Writer's Workshop. His first novel, An Underachiever's Diary, is a comic send-up of the meritocracy narrated by the underachieving half of a set of identical twins, and is set in Cambridge, Massachusetts. On the jacket of Anastas's second book, The Faithful Narrative of a Pastor's Disappearance: A Novel, Daniel Handler called it "hands down, the best novel of the year". It concerns the disappearance of the pastor of a liberal Congregational church in suburban Boston and was a New York Times Notable Book.

Journalism and other writings
Anastas's fiction, criticism, essays and journalism have appeared in Story, GQ, The Paris Review, The New Republic online, The New York Observer, The New York Times Book Review, The Washington Post, and Bookforum. In 2005, The Yale Review published his novella Versace Enthroned with Saints: Margaret, Jerome, Alex and the Angel Donatella and later awarded it the Smart Family Foundation Prize for Fiction.

Anastas has published articles on the Mayan Calendar 2012 hoax in The New York Times Magazine, the prosperity gospel in Harper's Magazine and a short piece about his father's nude portrait on Granta's website. His essay "The Foul Reign of Emerson's 'Self Reliance, also from The New York Times Magazine, was selected for The Best American Essays 2012, guest edited by David Brooks. His essay on the Gullah language folktale ″Buh Black Snake Git Ketch″ appeared in the Spring, 2020 issue of The Oxford American.

Memoir
His memoir, Too Good To Be True, was published in 2012. The title is taken from a sign that the author was made to wear around his neck by a childhood therapist. It tells the story of his stalled career as a writer, the end of his marriage, and his attempts to rebuild his life again. Anastas published the book with Amazon's fledgling publishing imprint in New York City and numerous bookstores have refused to stock it. Giles Harvey, writing in The New Yorker, groups Too Good to Be True in a category he calls the "failure memoir" and cites F. Scott Fitzgerald's The Crack-Up essays as an influence.

Works
 An Underachiever's Diary, Dial Press, 1998 
 The Faithful Narrative of a Pastor's Disappearance, FSG, 2001 
 Am Fuß des Gebirgs, Jung und Jung Verlag, Wien, 2005 
 Too Good to Be True, New Harvest, October 16, 2012,

References

External links

Interview with The Rumpus, August 19, 2009
Interview with The Onion's A.V. Club
Anastas Talking about Emerson's "Self-Reliance" on WBUR's "On Point with Tom Ashbrook"
Interview with The Days of Yore

Living people
American male journalists
Journalists from New York City
1969 births
Novelists from Massachusetts
Writers from New York City
People from Gloucester, Massachusetts
Iowa Writers' Workshop alumni
20th-century American novelists
20th-century American male writers
American memoirists
21st-century American novelists
Bennington College faculty
American male novelists
American male short story writers
20th-century American short story writers
21st-century American short story writers
21st-century American male writers
Novelists from New York (state)
Novelists from Vermont
20th-century American non-fiction writers
21st-century American non-fiction writers